Karl Johan Schuster (born 1 February 1985), known professionally as Shellback, is a Swedish record producer, songwriter and multi-instrumentalist. Shellback was listed as the No. 1 producer of 2012 on Billboard magazine's year end chart, and he also topped the list of their "Top 10 Songwriters Airplay Chart" the same year; he has won four Grammy Awards.

He regularly collaborates with songwriter Max Martin and together they have produced, written, or co-written songs for various artists such as P!nk, Taylor Swift, Adam Lambert, Britney Spears, Usher, Avril Lavigne, Ariana Grande, Adele and Maroon 5. Shellback has also collaborated with fellow producer Benny Blanco and has produced songs by himself, including "Want U Back" by Cher Lloyd and "Animals" by Maroon 5. He co-wrote and co-produced the song "Can't Stop the Feeling!" along with Martin and Justin Timberlake for the animated film Trolls (2016), earning a nomination for the Academy Award for Best Original Song in 2017.

Life and career
Karl Johan Schuster was born and raised in Karlshamn, Sweden. He started as a drummer in local indie rock bands in Karlshamn, as well as recording all instruments on the 2003 Meriah demo ...Turn Him Your Other Cheek (a strictly black metal recording), before joining the hardcore-metal scene as a vocalist in 2004 for Blinded Colony, with whom he recorded 2005's Promo Demo and 2006's Bedtime Prayers, drawing comparisons to fellow Swedish melodic death metal band In Flames, before leaving in 2007. In 2005 he also performed as a guest musician on the Faith album Sorg.

At the age of 16, Schuster met Max Martin through their mutual friend Julius. By that time, according to an interview in the Swedish music magazine Stim-magasinet, Schuster's taste in music was "too cool for school" and he had no interest in pop music whatsoever. Julius kept sending Schuster's indie rock-death metal demos to Martin, who became curious about what it would sound like if Schuster would make pop music. So in 2006 Martin invited Schuster to his studio in Stockholm to record a demo with him, and since 2007 Schuster has been signed to Martin's production company Maratone.

Among the first songs Schuster co-wrote with Martin are Pink's 2008 single "So What" and Britney Spears' 2008 single "If U Seek Amy". In 2012 Schuster won the STIM Platinum guitar prize.
In 2014, Schuster produced "Problem" alongside Martin and Ilya.
In 2015, Shellback collaborated with Swedish hardcore punk band Refused, as he is both a fan of the band's music and friends with the band's drummer David Sandstrom. Sandstrom sent him the versions of the songs "Elektra" and "366" that Refused had recorded with producer Nick Launay, and Shellback replied with his own arrangements of the two songs. Refused frontman Dennis Lyxzen explained in June 2015 that Shellback's versions were "far more Refused than our versions" and "were better" than the Launay-produced versions. The two songs appear on Refused's comeback album Freedom—"Elektra" was released as a single on 27 April 2015—which was released on the label Epitaph Records on 26 June 2015.

Discography
With Meriah
 ...Turn Him Your Other Cheek (Demo) (2003)

With Blinded Colony
 Promo Demo (2005)
 Bedtime Prayers (2006)

As a guest musician
 Faith - Sorg (2005)
 Refused - War Music (2019)

Production discography

Billboard Hot 100

The following singles peaked inside the top ten on the Billboard Hot 100.

Number-one singles
 "So What"
 "3"
 "Raise Your Glass"
 "Moves like Jagger"
 "We Are Never Ever Getting Back Together"
 "One More Night"
 "Shake It Off"
 "Blank Space"
 "Bad Blood"
 "Can't Stop the Feeling!"

Top 10 Hits
 "Whataya Want from Me"
 "DJ Got Us Fallin' in Love"
 "Fuckin' Perfect"
 "Loser Like Me"
 "I Wanna Go"
 "Payphone"
 "Scream"
 "I Knew You Were Trouble"
 "Problem"
 "Animals"
 "Style"
 "Wildest Dreams"
 "Just like Fire"
 "Send My Love (To Your New Lover)"
 "...Ready for It?"
 "I Don't Care"

Awards
Grammy Awards
 Album of the Year - 1989
 Best Pop Vocal Album - 1989
 Album of the Year - 25
 Best Song Written for Visual Media - "Can't Stop the Feeling!"

References

External links

1985 births
Living people
Grammy Award winners
People from Karlshamn
Swedish heavy metal singers
Swedish record producers
Swedish songwriters
21st-century Swedish singers
Musikförläggarnas pris winners